494 may refer to:
 Interstate 494
 494 Commuter Services
 Minuscule 494

See also
 Events in 494